Perekop may refer to:

Perekop, Ukraine, a village in Ukraine
Krasnoperekopsk, a short version of city's name located in Crimea
Perekop Isthmus, Crimea
Perekop fortress, Perekop
Perekop Gulf (Gulf of Perekop)